Up in the Wind is a 2013 Chinese road movie directed by Teng Huatao and starring Ni Ni and Jing Boran.

Plot
The movie features a female journalist from a big Shanghai magazine, forced to go to Nepal to write an article about traveling in Nepal. The main part of the movie has been shot in Kathmandu, Chitwan and Pokhara.

Cast
 Ni Ni
 Jing Boran
 Zhang Zixuan

Reception
As of January 12, the film has grossed $11.78 million at the box office.

References

External links 
 

2013 films
Chinese romantic comedy films
2013 romantic comedy films
Films directed by Teng Huatao
Films shot in Pokhara
2010s Mandarin-language films